David George Philip Cholmondeley, 7th Marquess of Cholmondeley,  (born 27 June 1960), styled Viscount Malpas from birth until 1968, and subsequently Earl of Rocksavage until 1990, is a British peer and filmmaker who acted as Lord Great Chamberlain of the United Kingdom from 1990 to 2022.

Early life and education
Lord Cholmondeley is a descendant of Sir Robert Walpole (1676–1745), the first Prime Minister of Great Britain. He is the son of Hugh Cholmondeley, 6th Marquess of Cholmondeley, and Lavinia, Marchioness of Cholmondeley (née Leslie). He is also a descendant of both the Rothschild family and the Sassoon family through his paternal grandmother, Sybil Sassoon. He has three older sisters: the Ladies Rose, Margot (married to Tony Huston), and Caroline (married to Baron Rodolphe d'Erlanger).

Like many members of his family, Cholmondeley was educated at Eton College. He later took classes at the Sorbonne in Paris.

Career

Film industry
Lord Cholmondeley is a filmmaker. As David Rocksavage, he also appeared in a small part in Eric Rohmer's film 4 aventures de Reinette et Mirabelle (1987). His professional name is derived from his title of Earl of Rocksavage. 

His chosen career was put on hold when he succeeded to the marquessate in 1990.
In 1995, he directed the film adaptation of Truman Capote's novel Other Voices, Other Rooms.

In 2007, he directed The Wreck (working title), starring Jean Simmons and James Wilby. The film was shot in Norfolk. It was later renamed Shadows in the Sun and released in 2009.

Inherited title
Cholmondeley became Marquess of Cholmondeley on 13 March 1990, upon the death of his father. Cholmondeley also inherited a half share of the office of Lord Great Chamberlain, and succeeded his father in exercising the function of the office for the duration of Queen Elizabeth II's reign. As Lord Great Chamberlain, Cholmondeley was ex officio a member of the House of Lords and attended the House of Lords in his ceremonial role such as at the State Opening of Parliament, although he did not sit in the House of Lords for debates as he was on a leave of absence. Upon Queen Elizabeth II's death on 8 September 2022, Lord Cholmondeley ceased to be Lord Great Chamberlain and a member of the House of Lords, with the office of the Lord Great Chamberlain passing to Rupert Carington, 7th Baron Carrington.

Lands and estates
 
The family seats are Houghton Hall in Norfolk, and Cholmondeley Castle, which is surrounded by a  estate near Malpas, Cheshire.

According to the Sunday Times Rich List in 2008, Cholmondeley has an estimated net worth of approximately £60m, attributed primarily to his inherited landholdings. Houghton Hall, ancestral home of the Marquesses of Cholmondeley since the establishment of the title in 1815, opens some of its rooms to the public.

Position at court
In 1974, at the age of fourteen, Cholmondeley, then known as the Earl of Rocksavage, was appointed as a Page of Honour to Queen Elizabeth II. He relinquished this role upon reaching the age limit in 1976.

One moiety of the ancient office of Lord Great Chamberlain is a Cholmondeley inheritance. This hereditary honour came into the Cholmondeley family through the marriage of the first Marquess of Cholmondeley to Lady Georgiana Charlotte Bertie, daughter of General Peregrine Bertie, 3rd Duke of Ancaster and Kesteven. The second, fourth, fifth, sixth and seventh holders of the marquessate have all held this office.

Cholmondeley exercised the office of Lord Great Chamberlain from 1990 to 2022, during the reign of Elizabeth II; in the event Charles III ceases to be king before Cholmondeley's death, he would exercise the office again.

Marriage and children
Lord Cholmondeley married (Sarah) Rose Hanbury, a fashion model, on 24 June 2009, their engagement having been announced two days prior. She is a daughter of Timothy Hanbury, a website designer, and Emma Hanbury (née Longman), a fashion designer. The landed gentry Hanbury family lived at Holfield Grange, Coggeshall, Essex.

Her maternal grandmother is Lady Elizabeth Lambart, daughter of Field Marshal Rudolph Lambart, 10th Earl of Cavan; Lady Elizabeth was one of the bridesmaids at the 1947 wedding of Princess Elizabeth; her paternal grandmother, Sara, was the daughter of racing driver Sir Tim Birkin, 3rd Baronet.

Three-and-a-half months after their wedding, on 12 October 2009, the Marchioness gave birth to twin sons, Alexander Hugh George and Oliver Timothy George. The elder son, Alexander, as heir apparent to the Marquessate, bears the courtesy title of Earl of Rocksavage; his brother is known as Lord Oliver Cholmondeley.

In March 2016, the Marquess and Marchioness had their third child, a daughter, Lady Iris Marina Aline Cholmondeley.

A friendship between the Marquess and Marchioness and Prince William and his wife, the Princess of Wales, has been reported; the Marchioness is a patron of the charity East Anglia's Children's Hospices (EACH), along with the Princess.

Titles, styles and arms

 27 June 1960 – 16 September 1968: Viscount Malpas
 16 September 1968 – 13 March 1990: Earl of Rocksavage
 13 March 1990 – present: The Most Honourable The Marquess of Cholmondeley

As the eldest son of the heir apparent of the 5th Marquess, he was known from birth by the courtesy title of Viscount Malpas. Upon his grandfather's death, he became the heir to the marquessate and was thus known by the courtesy title of Earl of Rocksavage, before inheriting the marquessate in 1990. He also inherited the following subsidiary titles:

 Baron Cholmondeley of Witch Malbank
 Baron Newburgh
 Earl of Cholmondeley
 Earl of Rocksavage
 Viscount Malpas
 Viscount Cholmondeley (Peerage of Ireland) 
 Baron Newborough (Peerage of Ireland)

Honours
 In the Queen's Birthday Honours List for 2007, Lord Cholmondeley was made a Knight Commander of the Royal Victorian Order (KCVO) for his 17 years of service as Lord Great Chamberlain.
 He was awarded the UK Version of the Queen Elizabeth II Golden Jubilee Medal in 2002.
 He was awarded the UK Version of the Queen Elizabeth II Diamond Jubilee Medal in 2012.
 He serves as a Deputy Lieutenant of the County of Norfolk. This gives him the post-nominal letters "DL" for life.

Notes

References

External links

 Houghton Hall
  Cholmondeley Castle
  Photos of Houghton Hall and Cholmondley Castle: As a special Millennium project, Garlinda Birkbeck was commissioned by the Marquis of Cholmondeley to photograph every house, building and person on his estates in Norfolk and Cheshire, capturing the world of his estates at the turn of the year 1999/2000.
 Mitchell Owens's interview with Lord Cholmondeley in The New York Times, 14 December 1997
 David Cholmondeley, 7th Marquess of Cholmondeley

1960 births
Living people
Knights Commander of the Royal Victorian Order
Lord Great Chamberlains
Crossbench hereditary peers
Deputy Lieutenants of Cheshire
Deputy Lieutenants of Norfolk
Sassoon family
Rothschild family
People educated at Eton College
People educated at Heatherdown School
Pages of Honour
English film directors
David
British people of German-Jewish descent
British people of Iraqi-Jewish descent
People from Houghton, Norfolk
7